Route 531, is a suburban freeway in the southern Sharon region of Israel, just north of the Tel Aviv Metropolitan Area. The highway begins at Highway 6 and terminates at the Ayalon Highway with an extension to the Coastal Highway.

The highway's easternmost section was constructed in the October 16, 2014, while parts of the extension of the highway to the Ayalon Highway in Herzliya opened starting in 2016.

Herzliya–Ra'anana extension
Originally the highway terminated east of Ra'anana. In 2008 a PFI tender was issued to continue constructing the highway westward from Ra'anana towards Highway 20 (Ayalon Highway) near the Mediterranean coast. By doing so it will pass nearby several large cities and connect all the major north–south highways in the region: Highway 6, Highway 4 and Highway 20. The project also includes extending Highway 20 several kilometers northwards, connecting it and Route 531 to Highway 2 (the Coastal Highway) heading northbound at a new interchange near Ga'ash. Its main section includes three travel lanes in each direction and two massive interchanges – at Ra'anana South (with Highway 4), and with the Ayalon Highway (Highway 20), plus a few smaller interchanges.

In addition, the project includes extending Sharon Railway with a double-track railway including a long railway tunnel and several passenger stations in the median of the highway along nearly the entire length of the road, using a design similar to that of the Route 431 suburban freeway. The new railway section will connect Ra'anana West railway station to the Coastal Railway.

Shapir Engineering originally won the PFI tender to extend the road and railway, but due to financial disagreements and complications caused by the worldwide financial crisis, the government canceled the PFI tender in the summer of 2010. Instead, the project was reorganized and funded directly by the treasury and managed by the National Roads Company. It was split off to several sections, each of which was tendered separately at an estimated total cost of NIS 4 billion (equivalent to slightly over US$1 billion), a move which postponed final completion by six years to 2019, although completed parts of the highway have been opened to traffic in stages starting in 2016.

Interchanges and Junctions

References

531
531